Pittsburgh Spirit were an indoor soccer team based in Pittsburgh and were one of the original six teams that played in the Major Indoor Soccer League (MISL). The Spirit were founded in 1978, suspended operation for the 1980–81 season, then returned to the MISL until owner Edward J. DeBartolo Sr. folded the team on April 11, 1986. The seven seasons of play in Pittsburgh the Spirit average attendance for the regular season was 6,351.

1981–82
The Pittsburgh Spirit were reinstated into the MISL after suspending operations during for the 1980–81 season. Stan Terlecki led the team with 74 goals, second in the MISL to Steve Zungul's (New York Arrows) 103 goals. Both Terlecki and Zungul were named MISL regular season MVP. Goaltender Krys Sobieski had the third-lowest goals-against average with a 4.20 GAA.

The Spirit would face the third-place Baltimore Blast in the playoffs. The Spirit won the first game of the playoffs 3–1 but lost the second game 6–5 in overtime. The Spirit lost the third game of the series 4–2, which eliminated the Spirit from post-season play.

1982–83
The Spirit did not repeat the success of their previous season and played .500 soccer for the 1982–83 season (24–24–0). Stan Terlecki once again led the Spirit in goals (65) and points (105), and forward Paul Child finished in the top 25 in points (68). Krys Sobieski played sub-.500 goal, going 19–20 and watched his GAA fall to 4.88. The Spirit did not qualify for the playoffs during this season.

1983–84
The Spirit would have their best season in 1983–84, going 32–16 despite losing two-time leading scorer Terlecki to the Golden Bay Earthquakes. The Spirit's attendance would peak during this season, drawing 8,000 fans. By comparison, the Pittsburgh Penguins averaged around 6,000 during the same season. Zeee Kapka would lead the Spirit with 66 points and former first round draft pick Joe Papaleo led the Spirit with a 16–8 record with a 4.12 GAA. Kevin Maher would earn the honor of MISL Rookie Of The Year. The Spirit made the playoffs, but would lose to the Cleveland Force three games to one. The scores of the games were 4–6, 4–1, 5–6 (OT), 3–5.

1984–85
Two-time former leading scorer Stan Terlecki returned to the team, but the Spirit finished in sixth place ten games under .500, going 19–29. Terlecki led the team with 39 goals and 66 points and goaltender Peter Mowlik finished the season 11–13 with a 4.71 GAA.

1985–86
The 1985–1986 season would be the final season for the Spirit. Although they finished only four games out of first place of the MISL's Eastern Division, they also finished in last place with a record of 23–25. Goaltender David Brcic was named to the All-MISL team. After the completion of the season, the Pittsburgh Spirit folded.

Return
There was an attempt to revive the Spirit for the final Major Soccer League season, but it did not come to be. An ownership group known as Pittsburgh Soccer Inc. was approved to operate the Major Soccer League expansion team for three years.

Staff
 General Manager – Chris Wright

Former players
 David Brcic (1985–86) 43 Apps 0 Goals
 Steve Buttle (1979–80) 28 Apps 35 Goals
 Micky Cave (1981–84)
 Clive Charles (1982)
  Paul Child (1981–86) 133 Apps 140 Goals
 Alfie Conn (1979–80)
 John Dolinsky (1978–79) 22 Apps 16 Goals
 Helmut Dudek (1985–86)
 Drago Dumbovic (1983–84) 37 Apps 32 Goals
 David Egan
 Charlie Falzon (1985–86)
 Graham Fyfe (1979–80) 31 Apps 37 Goals
 Charley Greene (1984–86)
  Fred Grgurev (1985–86)
 David Hoggan (1984–86)
 Godfrey Ingram (1985–86)
 Tommy Jenkins
 Zdzisław Kapka (1983–86) 45 Apps 30 Goals
  Erhardt Kapp (1984–86)
 Nicky Klinarski (1985–86)
 Marcio Leite (1984–86)
  Mark Liveric (1985–86)
 Joseph Luxbacher (1978-80) scored first goal in franchise history
 Dave MacKenzie (1984–85)
 Pat McCluskey (1982–83)
 David McNiven (1984–85)
 Kevin Maher (1983–86)
 Peter Mannos (1978–79) 16 Apps 0 Goals
 Alan Mayer (1979–80) 17 Apps 0 Goals
 Shep Messing (1984–85)
 Joe Mihaljevic (1982–86)
 Piotr Mowlik (1984–86) 27 Apps 0 Goals
 Bill Nichol (1981–82) 44 Apps 26 Goals
 Sid Nolan (1978–79) 23 Apps 21 Goals
 Grzegorz Ostalczyk (1981–85)
 Joe Papaleo (1983–84) 25 Apps 0 Goals
 Art Rex (1979–80)
 Nathan Sacks (1982)
 Dave Sarachan (1978–79) 23 Apps 23 Goals
 Krzysztof Sobieski (1981–83) 70 Apps 0 Goals
 Janusz Sybis (1983–86) 42 Apps 35 Goals
 Stanisław Terlecki "Stan the Man" (1981–83) 88 Apps 139 Goals (1984–85) 39 Apps 39 Goals
 George Tiger (1984–85) 93 Apps 19 Goals
 Adam Topolski (1984–86)
 Keith Tozer (1981–84) 85 Apps 8 Goals
 Val Tuska (1985–86)
 Bob Vosmaer (1984–85)
 Roger Wynter (1984–85)

Former coaches
 Bruno Schwarz (1978–79)
 Alex Pringle (1979)
 Len Bilous (1979–80)
 John Kowalski (1981–85)
  Don Popovic (1985–1986)

Individual Honours

MISL MVP
1981–1982 – Stan Terlecki (jointly held)

MISL All-Star Team
1981–1982 – Stan Terlecki
1985–1986 – David Brcic

MISL Rookie of the Year
1983–1984 – Kevin Maher

Coach of the Year
1979–80 – Len Bilous (jointly held)

References

External links
Pittsburgh Spirit on American Soccer History Archives

Major Indoor Soccer League (1978–1992) teams
Spirit
Soccer clubs in Pittsburgh
1978 establishments in Pennsylvania
1986 disestablishments in Pennsylvania